Aisin Seiki is a major manufacturer of automobile transmissions.

Automatic transmissions
Aisin automatic transmissions are manufactured by Aisin Seiki and Aisin AW, formerly known as Aisin-Warner, and which was established in 1969 as a joint venture between Aisin Seiki and BorgWarner.  The joint venture terminated in 1987.  While Aisin Seiki manufactures a variety of automotive components including automatic transmissions for heavy duty vehicle applications, Aisin AW manufactures automatic transmissions for light vehicle applications, including hybrid electric vehicle powertrains, as well as NAV Radio.

As of 2005, Aisin AW surpassed General Motors Powertrain Division as the largest producer of automatic transmissions in the world, producing 4.9 million units, with a market share of 16.4% of the global market for automatics.  Toyota Motor Corporation and Aisin Seiki are the two major shareholders of Aisin AW, with 51.9% and 42% respectively.  Aisin AW, which was set up to be the sole source of RWD automatic transmissions to Toyota, subsequently developed FWD/AWD automatic transmissions.  Aisin, as one of the major Toyota group suppliers, shares many designs and development activities with Toyota.  See Toyota A transmission for a complete list of Toyota/Aisin models.  Aisin AW supplies automatic transmissions to 55 automotive manufacturers around the world, virtually every major OEM.  These include General Motors, Ford, Jeep, Mitsubishi, Nissan, Saab, VW, Volvo, Hyundai, MINI among others.

Longitudinal

T35 - 3-speed longitudinal
T65/T66 - 3-speed longitudinal
Aisin A172 - 3-speed longitudinal class micro (Suzuki Samurai)
Aisin A174 - 4-speed longitudinal class micro (Suzuki Jimny)
Aisin TW-40E - 4-speed longitudinal class micro (Suzuki Jimny)
Aisin 03-72LE (GM M41) — 4-speed longitudinal (Suzuki Escudo/Sidekick/Vitara, Chevrolet Tracker 4-door, Suzuki APV, Isuzu Panther, Suzuki X-90, Mazda MX-5 NB & Toyota HiAce)
Aisin 03-72LS — 4-speed longitudinal (Suzuki Grand Vitara 5-door)
Aisin TB-50LS — 5-speed longitudinal (Suzuki Grand Vitara 3.2 V6 5-door, Isuzu MU-X 2.5), also known as Toyota A750F
450-43LE — 4-speed longitudinal (Isuzu NPR Cab-Over Truck)
AW-4 (Similar to the A340H) 4-speed longitudinal
1987–2001 Jeep Cherokee
1993 Jeep Grand Cherokee
1987–1992 Jeep Comanche
AS68RC (2007-2012 Dodge Ram 6.7 L 3500/4500/5500 Cab Chassis) 6-speed longitudinal
AS69RC (2013-current Dodge Ram 6.7 L 3500/4500/5500 Cab Chassis, and optional in some 3500 model trucks  Dodge Ram 3500 Pickup) 6-speed longitudinal with more robust components and a new control system 
A466ND (2016- Nissan Titan XD) 6-speed longitudinal, similar ratios to the AS69RC but developed exclusively for the 2nd gen Titan
AS66RC (2014-Current Dodge Ram 3500/4500/5500 Cab Chassis with Gasoline Engine) 6-speed longitudinal apparently derived from AS69RC
Aisin B-600 transmission.  6-speed longitudinal (Hyundai Genesis 3.8)
Aisin R6AWH / V6AWH transmission.  6-speed longitudinal
AW TB60-LS, 6-speed longitudinal
TB-61SN, 6-speed longitudinal
TB-68LS, 6-speed longitudinal
Aisin AWR6B45, 6 speed longitudinal (Toyota Fortuner 2.4, Toyota Innova 2.4)
Aisin TR-60SN - 6-speed HD longitudinal
 Volkswagen Touareg (2002-2010), Porsche Cayenne (2003-2010), Audi Q7 (2005-2010) (Volkswagen transmission code: 09D)
Aisin TL-80SN - 8-speed longitudinal
Aisin TL-80NF - 8 speed longitudinal (Mitsubishi Pajero Sport)
Aisin TR-80SD - 8-speed HD longitudinal
 Volkswagen Touareg (2011-2017), Porsche Cayenne (2011-2016), Audi Q7 (2011-2015) (Volkswagen transmission code: 0C8), and Hongqi HS7
Aisin TR-82SD - 8-speed HD longitudinal, hybrid
 Volkswagen Touareg Hybrid (2011-2015), Porsche Cayenne Hybrid (2011-2015), Porsche Panamera Hybrid (2011-2015)
Aisin AWR10L65 - 10-speed Direct Shift-10A longitudinal (LS 350 & LS 500, Land Cruiser (J300), Tundra (XK70))
Aisin AWRHM50 - 10-speed Multi-Stage Hybrid System longitudinal (LS 500h)

Transverse

T35TB/T37TB - 3-speed transverse
50-40LE/50-42LE — 4-speed transverse
 1996-2002 Volvo C70
 1998-2003 Saab 9-3
60-40LE — 4-speed transverse
80-40LE — 4-speed transverse 
 2002- Pontiac G3
 2002- Ford Fiesta/Ford Fusion (Europe) 1.6
 2004- Chevrolet Aveo
 2004- Daewoo Kalos
 2004- Suzuki Swift
 2004- Toyota Echo, Yaris, Vitz (Toyota U440E)
 2013 Chevrolet Spark
Aisin AF23 transmission — 5-speed transverse
55-50SN/RE5F22A/AF33-5 — 5-speed transverse
TF-60SN - 6-speed transverse
 Volkswagen transmission code 09G, 09M, 09K
 2003-2010 Volkswagen Transporter T5
 2007 Volkswagen Jetta, US market
 2009 Volkswagen Tiguan, US market
 various Seat, Skoda, Audi models
 2005-2011 Mini Cooper, Code 6F21WA
 2012- BMW 2 Series F45 ActiveTourer and F46 Gran Tourer with 3-cylinder engines, Code 6F21WA (8-speed models use the AWF8F35 transmission)
 Mini F54, F55, F56, F57, F60 with 6-speed automatic (8-speed models use the AWF8F35 transmission)
 BMW X1 (F48) with 3-cylinder engines 6-speed automatic  (4-cylinder models use the 8-speed AWF8F35 transmission)
Aisin TF-70SC - 6-speed transverse
Aisin AW60T-6F25 Automatic, Fiat 500 Abarth, Fiat 500L, Jeep Commander (2022)
Aisin AWTF-80SC/TF-81SC/AF21 transmission — 6-speed transverse
Aisin FF Series - 6-speed transverse
Aisin TM-60LS - 6-speed transverse
TF60-Series AWF6F16 - 6-speed transverse
TF70-Series Aisin AWF6F25 (300Nm) - 6-speed transverse 
 Groupe PSA transmission code AT6-III (EAT6)
 Peugeot 208, 508 II, 308 II, 408 II, 2008, 3008 II, 5008 II
 Citroën C3 III, C4 II, C4 Picasso II
 DS DS3
TF80-Series Aisin AWF6F45 (450Nm) - 6-speed transverse
 Groupe PSA transmission code AM6-III (EAT6)
Aisin FF Series - 8-speed transverse
TG-Series
Aisin AWF8F35 - 8-speed transverse
Aisin AWF8F45 - 8-speed heavy-duty transverse

e-CVT transmissions

Aisin T-030 transmission — Hybrid Electric Planetary (Ford Escape Hybrid), transverse
Aisin T-031 transmission — Hybrid Electric Planetary (Ford Escape Hybrid), transverse
Aisin T-100 transmission — Hybrid Electric Planetary (Lexus GS450h), longitudinal
Aisin K-111 transmission — Hybrid Electric Planetary (Toyota Camry Hybrid), transverse
Aisin AWFHT15 (Toyota Prius)
Aisin AWRHM50

Manual transmissions
Aisin manual and automated manual transmissions are manufactured by Aisin AI.

Longitudinal rear-wheel drive
1984– AX4 — 4-speed
1984-1987 Jeep Cherokee
1986-1992 Jeep Comanche
1984– AX5 — 5-speed
1984-2000 Jeep Cherokee
1986-1992 Jeep Comanche
1987-2002 Jeep Wrangler
1988– AX15 — 5-speed
1989-1999 Jeep Cherokee
1989-1992 Jeep Comanche
1993 Jeep Grand Cherokee
1989-1999 Jeep Wrangler
2018- AL6 (D478) — 6-speed
2018- Jeep Wrangler (JL)
2020- Jeep Gladiator (JT)
TOYOTA PICKUP STANDARD TRANSMISSIONS (ALL AISIN)
1988-1995 R150F 5-speed with 3VZ-E V6 engine
1989-1995 G58 5-speed with 22R-E 4-cyl engine used in sr5 models with ADD
1986-1987 R151F 5-speed with 22R-TE 4-cyl engine
1985-1995 W56 5-speed with 22R-E 4-cyl engine
1984-1987 G54 5-speed with 22R 4-cyl engine
1984-1987 G52 5-speed with 22R 4-cyl engine
1983 L52 5-speed with 22R 4-cyl engine
1981-1982 L50 5-speed with 22R 4-cyl engine
TOYOTA PICKUP AUTOMATIC TRANSMISSIONS  (ALL AISIN)
1984-1999 A340F 4-speed with 22R-E, 22R-TE 4-cyl engines
1988-1995 A340H 4-speed with 3VZ-E 3.0l SOHC V6-cyl engines
1995-1998 A340F 4-speed with 5VZ-E 3.4l DOHC V6-cyl engines ( T-100 only )
May 1997– AH15/AH16 — 6-speed
Toyota Dyna, Toyota Coaster, Hino Dutro
December 1997– AZ6 — 6-speed
Mazda MX-5/Roadster/Miata, Nissan Silvia, Mazda RX-8, Toyota Altezza/Lexus IS200, Toyota 86/Scion FR-S/Subaru BR-Z
May 1999– AW5 — 5-speed
Toyota Hilux, Toyota Tacoma, Suzuki Grand Vitara/Escudo
October 2003– AM15 — 5-speed
Toyota Dyna, Hino Dutro
February 2004– AY6 — 6-speed longitudinal
Toyota Land Cruiser Prado, Toyota Tundra, Toyota Tacoma, Cadillac CTS, Holden Commodore
AR5 — 5-speed longitudinal (GM RPO MA5)
Toyota Hilux, Toyota Land Cruiser/Prado, Isuzu Trooper/Bighorn, Suzuki Grand Vitara/Escudo, BMC Levend, Chevrolet Colorado, GMC Canyon, Pontiac Solstice, Saturn Sky, Polaris Slingshot
AH5 — 5-speed longitudinal
Toyota Land Cruiser
AG5 — 5-speed longitudinal
Toyota Hilux, Toyota Hiace, Suzuki Grand Vitara/Escudo, Chevrolet Niva
AM5 — 5-speed longitudinal
Toyota Dyna, Toyota Coaster, Hino Dutro

Transverse front-wheel drive
December 1998– BC5 — 5-speed
Toyota Yaris/Vitz
August 1999– BC16 — 6-speed
Toyota Celica, Toyota MR-2, Toyota Corolla
December 2002– MC5 — 5-speed automated manual
Toyota Yaris/Vitz, Suzuki Swift
June 2002– BE35 — 5-speed
Toyota Avensis, Toyota RAV4
January 2004– MC25 — 5-speed automated manual
Toyota Corolla
February 2005– BG6 — 6-speed
Toyota Avensis, Toyota Corolla, Toyota RAV4, Mazda6, Mazda5, Mitsubishi Eclipse, Mitsubishi Grandis, Jeep Compass, Jeep Patriot, Dodge Caliber, Dodge Journey, Lotus Exige, Lotus Evora
2005–present Aisin AWF-21, FWD - 5 & 6-speed
Ford Five Hundred, Ford Fusion -till 2009,Ford Mondeo 2007-2011, Mercury Montego, Mercury Milan -till 2009, Lincoln Zephyr/MKZ,2010-2014, MG6 Petrol & Diesel, Roewe 550, Mazda6, Mazda CX-7, Mazda CX-9, Land Rover LR2

Longitudinal rear-wheel drive (transaxle)
SP6 — 6-speed *** 996= Getrag 450
Porsche 911
SA6 - 6-speed
Lexus LFA

Others
April 1997– BC6 — 6-speed
August 1998– AP2 — industrial

References

External links
Official Aisin site
Official Aisin-AW site

 
Aisin transmissions